This is the discography of Yung Joc, an American rapper.

Albums

Studio albums

Mixtapes

Singles

As lead artist

As featured artist

Guest appearances

References

Hip hop discographies
Discographies of American artists